Lise Jeanne Roberte Weiler (2 November 1933 – 1 March 2021) was a French art expert. She became Knight of the Legion of Honour in 2010. Her husband was politician Jacques Toubon.

References

French art critics
French women art critics
1933 births
2021 deaths
People from Metz